is a Japanese organizational theorist and Professor Emeritus at the Graduate School of International Corporate Strategy of the Hitotsubashi University, best known for his study of knowledge management.

Biography
Nonaka was born in Tokyo in 1935 and as a child he lived through the Japanese defeat by the West during World War II. His nationalist spirit led him to believe that, in order to avoid further humiliation, Japan should adapt its technological and organizational skills. In 1958 Nonaka received his B.S. in political science of Waseda University.

After graduation Nonaka accepted a job in Fuji Electric, where he initiated a management program. This curriculum was in the 1960s further developed together with the business school of Keio University and offered to companies all over Japan. In 1967 Nonaka moved to US where in 1968 he obtained an MBA and in 1972 a PhD in Business Administration both at University of California, Berkeley.

Nonaka was the First Distinguished Drucker Scholar in Residence at the Drucker School and Institute, Claremont Graduate University; the Xerox Distinguished Faculty Scholar, Institute of Management, Innovation and Organization, UC Berkeley. Back in Japan he became professor at the Graduate School of International Corporate Strategy of Hitotsubashi University.

Work 

Nonaka co-wrote several noteworthy articles with Hirotaka Takeuchi, a colleague at Hitotsubashi University, including: 
 The article The New New Product Development Game, in which they emphasised speed and flexibility for new product development. This article is considered to be the one of the roots of the Scrum framework, one of the most used agile software development techniques. 
 The Nonaka-Takeuchi model of accumulation of tacit knowledge. 
 
In 2008, the Wall Street Journal listed him as one of the  most influential persons on business thinking, and The Economist included him in its "Guide to Management Ideas and Gurus".

Nonaka has also proposed the SECI model, to present the spiraling knowledge processes of interaction between explicit knowledge and tacit knowledge. SECI is short for:
 Socialization
 Externalization
 Combination
 Internalization

Selected bibliography
 Essence of Failure: Organizational Study of the Japanese Armed Forces during the World War II (with R. Tobe, Y. Teramoto, S. Kamata, T. Suginoo and T. Murai), Tokyo: Diamond-sha, 1984 (in Japanese). 

 Enabling Knowledge Creation (with G. von Krogh and K. Ichijo), New York: Oxford University Press, 2000. 
 Hitotsubashi on Knowledge Management (with co-authors), John Wiley (Asia), 2003. 
 The Essence of Innovation (with A. Katsumi), Tokyo: Nikkei BP, 2004 (in Japanese). 
 The Essence of Strategy (with co-authors), Tokyo: Nikkei BP, 2005 (in Japanese).
 Managing Flow (with T. Hirata and R. Toyama), Palgrave Macmillan, 2008. 
 The Core of Organization is People (with H. Sakai, H. Yoshida, T. Sakikawa, T. Hirata, K. Isomura and Yasunobu NARITA), Kyoto: Nakanishiya, 2009 (in Japanese). 
 The Philosophy-Creating Company (with K. Genma, T. Hirata, K. Isomura and Yasunobu NARITA), Kyoto: Nakanishiya, 2012 (in Japanese).

About Ikujiro Nonaka

 Strategy Business Magazine article in Winter 2008 issue

References

External links

Biography at Hitotsubashi University

1935 births
Living people
People from Tokyo
Japanese business theorists
Fujitsu people
Waseda University alumni
University of California, Berkeley alumni
University of California, Berkeley fellows
Academic staff of Hitotsubashi University
Recipients of the Order of the Sacred Treasure, 3rd class